The Rheingau wine region, located in the state of Hesse, is one of the 13 regions (Anbaugebiete) for quality wine in Germany. For each of the quality wine regions, the state where it is located keeps a formal vineyard roll (Weinbergsrolle) which lists all formally recognised vineyards of the region, with detailed surveying maps defining the geographical extent of each vineyard. This list defines which geographical designations may appear on the wine labels under the principles set down by the national wine law. The list includes single vineyard designations (Einzellagen), which are grouped together into collective vineyards (Großlagen). Both single and collective vineyard designations are used together with village names.

The state of Hesse lists the following vineyards. The vineyards are listed broadly from east to west, in the downstream direction of river Rhine.

References 

Wine regions of Germany
Vineyards of Germany
Lists of vineyards and wineries
Vineyards